Ryan Lester (born 26 August 1992) is an Australian rules footballer who plays for the Brisbane Lions in the Australian Football League (AFL).

Ryan attended Glen Waverley Secondary College in Melbourne's Eastern suburbs.

He made his debut in Round 1 of the 2011 AFL season against the Fremantle Dockers.

Ryan injured his lisfranc ligament, which is the ligament that stabilises the first and second metatarsal bones, against the Melbourne Demons in round 3.

Statistics
Updated to the end of round 22, 2022 

|-
| 2011 ||  || 35
| 3 || 2 || 1 || 15 || 22 || 37 || 11 || 1 || 0.7 || 0.3 || 5.0 || 7.3 || 12.3 || 3.7 || 0.3 || 0
|-
| 2012 ||  || 35
| 19 || 3 || 4 || 168 || 120 || 288 || 77 || 30 || 0.2 || 0.2 || 8.8 || 6.3 || 15.2 || 4.1 || 1.6 || 0
|-
| 2013 ||  || 35
| 16 || 4 || 5 || 122 || 147 || 269 || 46 || 41 || 0.3 || 0.3 || 7.6 || 9.2 || 16.8 || 2.9 || 2.6 || 0
|-
| 2014 ||  || 35
| 14 || 3 || 1 || 116 || 148 || 264 || 49 || 65 || 0.2 || 0.1 || 8.3 || 10.6 || 18.9 || 3.5 || 4.6 || 0
|-
| 2015 ||  || 35
| 9 || 8 || 2 || 60 || 60 || 120 || 38 || 21 || 0.9 || 0.2 || 6.7 || 6.7 || 13.3 || 4.2 || 2.3 || 0
|-
| 2016 ||  || 35
| 19 || 11 || 9 || 111 || 113 || 224 || 63 || 50 || 0.6 || 0.5 || 5.8 || 5.9 || 11.8 || 3.3 || 2.6 || 0
|-
| 2017 ||  || 35
| 22 || 14 || 8 || 198 || 159 || 357 || 117 || 63 || 0.6 || 0.4 || 9.0 || 7.2 || 16.2 || 5.3 || 2.9 || 1
|-
| 2018 ||  || 35
| 15 || 0 || 2 || 133 || 107 || 240 || 69 || 40 || 0.0 || 0.1 || 8.9 || 7.1 || 16.0 || 4.6 || 2.7 || 0
|-
| 2019 ||  || 35
| 9 || 0 || 0 || 81 || 27 || 108 || 32 || 30 || 0.0 || 0.0 || 9.0 || 3.0 || 12.0 || 3.6 || 3.3 || 0
|-
| 2020 ||  || 35
| 15 || 0 || 1 || 107 || 70 || 177 || 62 || 35 || 0.0 || 0.1 || 7.1 || 4.7 || 11.8 || 4.1 || 2.3 || 0
|-
| 2021 ||  || 35
| 17 || 1 || 0 || 112 || 86 || 198 || 72 || 32 || 0.1 || 0.0 || 6.6 || 5.1 || 11.6 || 4.2 || 1.9 || 0
|-
| 2022 ||  || 35
| 3 || 0 || 0 || 16 || 9 || 25 || 4 || 6 || 0.0 || 0.0 || 5.3 || 3.0 || 8.3 || 1.3 || 2.0 || 
|- class=sortbottom
! colspan=3 | Career
! 161 !! 46 !! 33 !! 1239 !! 1068 !! 2307 !! 640 !! 414 !! 0.3 !! 0.2 !! 7.7 !! 6.6 !! 14.3 !! 4.0 !! 2.6 !! 1
|}

Notes

References

External links

Living people
1992 births
Australian people of English descent
Brisbane Lions players
Australian people of South African descent
Australian rules footballers from Victoria (Australia)
Oakleigh Chargers players